Elias Nilsson, (born 1 April 1910 in Stugun, Sweden, died 9 November 2001 in Lit, Sweden) was a Swedish cross-country skier. In 1938, he won the Vasaloppet.

References 

1910 births
2001 deaths
Swedish male cross-country skiers
Vasaloppet winners